Andy Knowles (born Andrew John Knowles; 30 June 1981, in Bolton) is an artist, director and musician.

Knowles started his drumming career with Skuta, and then in 2003 formed the cult group I Love Lucy out of the Glaswegian Art rock scene. Touring as drum tech with Glaswegian band Franz Ferdinand, Knowles met Matthew and Eleanor Friedberger of the New York band The Fiery Furnaces and was invited to join the group.

After extensive touring and recording drums on the Fiery Furnaces album Bitter Tea, Knowles left the band and rejoined Franz Ferdinand as a live drummer/keyboard player.

Knowles presently fronts the London-based band $au$age$.

References
 "Set A Man On Fire, Name Next LP – Franz Ferdinand Do Whatever They Want", VH1
 "The Invincible Band", Sunday Herald (11 September 2005)

1981 births
Living people
Alumni of the Glasgow School of Art
English drummers
British male drummers
Musicians from Manchester
Musicians from the Metropolitan Borough of Bolton
21st-century drummers
21st-century British male musicians